The following is a summary of the 2007 season by Paraguayan football (soccer) club Olimpia Asunción.

Olimpia participated in the following competitions in 2007: Torneo Apertura and Torneo Clausura (pertaining to the Paraguayan first division).

Torneo Apertura 2007

For the start of the 2007 season Olimpia had former player and star José Cardozo as the coach. However, results were not good and Alicio Solalinde replaced him halfway during the tournament.

Team roster

Final standing

Results

Top scorers
Cristian Rolando Ledesma finished as the top scorer for Olimpia in the Apertura tournament with 10 goals scored. Mauricio Molina with 10 goals.

Torneo Clausura 2007

For the Clausura tournament, Alicio Solalinde continued at the helm of the team but was eventually replaced by Carlos Jara Saguier due to poor results. Important signings included that of Paraguayan international veteran Roberto Acuña from Rosario Central, Osvaldo Diaz from Club Guaraní and Rolando Renaut from Club 12 de Octubre.

Team roster

Final standing

Results

Top scorers
Martin Adrian Garcia was the top scorer for the Clausura, finishing with 10 goals. Gilberto Palacios finished in second with 9 goals.

Aggregate table 2007
Olimpia finished in third place overall for the 2007 season, which earned the team a spot in the Copa Sudamericana 2008.

See also
 2008 Club Olimpia season

2007
Olimpia